Bullous small vessel vasculitis (also known as Bullous variant of small vessel vasculitis) is a cutaneous condition in which patients with small vessel vasculitis will develop superimposed vesicles and bullae, especially on the distal extremities.

See also 
 Bullous lymphedema
 List of cutaneous conditions

References 

Vascular-related cutaneous conditions